Sunset Strip is a 2012 documentary directed by Hans Fjellestad and produced by Tommy Alastra. The documentary explores the history of the mile and a half long stretch of road through West Hollywood known as Sunset Strip. It premiered at the South by Southwest Film Festival.

Synopsis

The film begins with a poem recited by Mark Mahoney, and utilizes several celebrities to discuss the history of the Sunset Strip. The Sunset Strip was born during the Roaring Twenties as a dirt road connecting Hollywood's big studios to the new development known as Beverly Hills. The so-called strip was just outside of the LAPD's jurisdiction, which provided the ideal environment for speakeasies, brothels, and crime of every level, but also led to much creativity. Using the stars who worked and found success there, this film explores the stories that make up the history of the Sunset Strip.

Much of the time spent is on the 1950-1970s era, but the film touches upon major events such as the Golden Age of Hollywood at Ciros and the Trocadero, The Doors playing at the Whiskey-A-Go-Go and The Roxy, legends about Mickey Cohen, and the multiple influential rock artists who called that part of the city home.

Production 
Tommy Alastra Productions began shooting in 2010. The film features so-called "guerilla footage" (amateur shots, often from the crowd's perspective) of the Strip's club and rock and roll shows, and interviews shot in different locations. Conversation-style interviews about memories are used, as opposed to the traditional "talking at the camera" format of documentaries. As a result, the film eschews the more structured format of shaping its ideas.

Many of the interviews feature more than one actor or musician, and Tommy Alastra Productions compiled footage under multiple sources. It was a challenge to remove background noise, create smooth sound quality and ensure archival footage was presented clearly as a result.

Celebrity appearances 
Various musicians, movie celebrities, and personalities are asked about their experiences in and around the Sunset Strip, and their recollection of important moments (such as the shutdown of Tower Records).

Music 
The documentary lists a total of 48 songs in the credits, ranging from “You Set the Scene” by Love to “The Trip” by Donovan as well as music from Ratt, X, The Pussycat Dolls and Jane's Addiction.  Slash, Billy Corgan, Robbie Krieger of The Doors and Perry Farrell are all featured speakers in the documentary.

Release and distribution 
Sunset Strip debuted at the South by Southwest (SXSW) film festival in Austin Texas, The Cannes Film Festival in France and several others before being acquired by Showtime Networks and Netflix through Ben Silverman's Electus Distribution.

A special Collector's Edition DVD was also released, and contained bonus interviews from several celebrities, including Hugh Hefner, Dave Navarro, Ozzy Osbourne, Keanu Reeves, Alice Cooper and more.

References

External links
 

2012 films
2012 documentary films
American documentary films
Documentary films about Hollywood, Los Angeles
Documentary films about Los Angeles
Sunset Boulevard (Los Angeles)
Films produced by Donovan Leitch (actor)
2010s English-language films
2010s American films